Barasana is one of the various languages spoken by the Indigenous peoples of the Americas belonging to the Amazonian region, specifically in Colombia. It belongs to the Eastern branch of the Tucanoan language family. The people who speak the language are also known as the Barasana. The population of its native speakers is about 1,990 according to a census taken in 1993. Native speakers' tribes are spread out among the Pira Paraná River in Colombia and the banks of the Vaupés River Basin.

The different dialects within this language family utilize their individual languages as barriers to distinguish themselves through their own identity. Marriages between two people who speak the same language are taboo; for they are marrying their own brothers and sisters. Instead, Barasanans participate in exogamous marriages, which promote multilingualism of the people in the region. This also serves as an explanation for similarities between different dialects in the region. Barasana and Eduria are often considered separate languages by the individuals of these groups, who are allowed to intermarry. However, the languages' similarities are up to 98%; the other 2% accounts for minor differences in phonology.

Many different grammar characteristics of Barasana separate it distinctively from various other groups in the language family. Out of the Eastern Tucanoan languages, Barasana is the only one to maintain a three portion distinction between spatial and temporal distances. It also differs in many other things such as nasality of words, consonantal systems, phonemes, and imperatives.

Classification 
Barasana is an aboriginal Amerindian language spoke in the Vaupés region of Colombia in the Amazon Basin.  The language belongs to the Tucanoan language family, specifically the Eastern branch. Most closely related to Barasana are Macuna, Kubeo, and Desano, also Eastern Tucanoan languages located in Colombia. Barasana and Eduria are considered separate languages by their native speakers, who can intermarry due to cultural differences regardless of the language similarities. It is also classified of having a Linguistic typology of OVS.

Geographic distribution 
Native speakers' tribes are located in Colombia, specifically in the regions of the Vaupés River Basin and the Pira Paraná River. The Vapués river can be seen in the map. According to a 1993 census, there are approximately 1,900 speakers; which classifies this language as endangered. It is vigorously used in standard form, but is not widespread throughout the region.

Dialects/Varieties 
The Barasana dialect is also known as Southern Barasano, Come Masa, Comematsa, Janera, Paneroa, Yebamasa; Eduria is also known as Edulia, Taibano, Taiwaeno, Taiwano.

Phonology 
It has 23 phonemes, containing 11 consonants and twelve vowels. There are various symbols that are used in the language that represent the various phonemic orthography of the language of Barasano itself. A phonological word in Barasano can consist of either one, or even up to nine syllables. Another important aspect of the language is stress and pitch. Many words in the language itself can be considered either high or low pitch. The Barasano language expresses this importance by way of the phonemics on the word level.

Examples 
Consonants: 
 /ta/ --> Grass
 /kahi/ --> Coca
 /rase/ --> Toucan 
Vowels:
 /wa/ --> to go 
 /oha/ --> to enter woods

Vowels 
Barí has six vowels: /a, e, i, ɨ, o, u/.

Consonants

Grammar

Mood and modality 
Barasano has interrogative and imperative markers the take place of evidential endings found at the end of a verb.

Examples 
Colors: 
 ñĩĩ --> black
 boti --> white
 sũã --> red
 sʉri --> yellow 
Body parts: 
 hoa --> hair
 kahea --> eyes
 gãmõrõ --> ears
 rise --> mouth

References

Languages of Colombia
Indigenous languages of the South American Northwest
Tucanoan languages
Tonal languages
Object–verb–subject languages